Bielczyk is a Polish surname. Notable people with the surname include:

 Piotr Bielczyk (born 1952), Polish javelin thrower
 Zofia Bielczyk (born 1958), Polish hurdler, wife of Piotr

Polish-language surnames